Intense Tropical Cyclone Ivan was a powerful tropical cyclone that struck Madagascar in February 2008. Forming from a persistent area of convection on February 7, Ivan initially tracked southeastward, before looping to the west-southwest. Encountering favourable conditions, it strengthened to attain peak winds on February 17 before striking northeastern Madagascar. It degenerated into a remnant low pressure area as it crossed the island, and briefly re-organized into a weak tropical depression before dissipating on February 22.

Ivan caused heavy damage in Madagascar, leaving severe flooding and wind damage. In Île Sainte-Marie, the worst hit area, 90% of the infrastructure was destroyed, and 70% of the structures were destroyed. In addition, severe flooding and high winds in Toamasina left the entire city without electricity or drinkable water. In all, over 330,000 people were left homeless, and the storm caused 93 deaths.

Meteorological history

On February 5,an area of convection persisted about 555 km (900 mi) north of Réunion in the southwest Indian Ocean. The system maintained a broad low-level circulation with associated deep convection, and it slowly developed banding features. By early on February 7, the circulation had become better defined as it remained in an area of weak wind shear and strong diffluence. At 0600 UTC, Météo-France (MFR) classified it as Tropical Depression Eleven about 880 km (550 mi) north-northeast of Mauritius. Around the same time, the Joint Typhoon Warning Center (JTWC) began issuing advisories on the system as Tropical Cyclone 18S. The depression tracked east-southeastward, under the influence of a mid-level ridge. A cutoff low to the south of the system enhanced upper-level conditions, and it quickly strengthened into Tropical Storm Ivan.

The storm rapidly organized and developed an eye feature. Its intensification rate slowed as an upper-level trough began restricting outflow, and the motion of Ivan became nearly stationary as it entered an area of weak steering currents. With its overall environment remaining favourable, the JTWC upgraded Ivan to tropical cyclone status – winds greater than 119 km/h (74 mph) – early on February 9. However, the MFR retained Ivan as a strong tropical storm. Late on February 9, the storm temporarily weakened when wind shear increased, though the next day it re-intensified as convection increased; a banding eye formed in the center of the convection, prompting the JTWC to re-upgrade Ivan to tropical cyclone status late on February 10. On February 11, the MFR upgraded Ivan to tropical cyclone status 1025 km (640 mi) northeast of Mauritius.

By February 14, it had sped up and entered a more favourable environment, becoming a severe tropical storm. On February 15, Ivan was re-upgraded to a tropical cyclone as favourable conditions persisted. Ivan was further upgraded to an Intense Tropical Cyclone on February 16 as it moved closer to Madagascar. Ivan made landfall north of Fanoarivo, Madagascar on February 17. Once overland, rapid weakening occurred due to the rugged terrain of the island. Ivan was forecast to regenerate over the Mozambique Channel into a tropical depression once it left Madagascar. Ivan traversed Madagascar, heading southwest. Its remnants emerged back over water on February 21, and Météo-France resumed advisories on "filling depression Ex-Ivan". Ivan, severely disrupted by Madagascar, did not strengthen any further; the last advisory was issued on February 22.

Impact

Cyclone Ivan moved ashore on Madagascar near the city of Toamasina on February 17, producing winds of 125 mph (200 km/h). According to local news agencies, Sainte Marie island off the coast of Madagascar was the highest affected area, with 9 people killed and 90% of the island's infrastructure destroyed, including a hotel which collapsed. On the island, all flights were suspended or canceled during the storm, and most areas were left without electric power. Also, 75 percent of the structures on the island were completely destroyed.

Because of this, many families had little or no food to eat. In Analanjirofo, the worst hit region on the mainland Madagascar, 80,000 people were left homeless, and most of the schools, houses and other structures were lost as a result of the flooding and high wind. Another major aspect of the damage there was the Antaratasy bridge, a connector between the region of Atsinanana and cities to the north, which was completely destroyed, isolating several people from their families. Its collapse, in addition to the extensive damage to communications, made it difficult or impossible to contact people who may have been affected by Ivan.

In the city of Toamasina, all water and electricity were cut off as a result of the storm. High winds downed trees and power lines, and rising flood waters were the focus of concern. In the region of Alaotra Mangoro Region, almost 23,000 people were in need of assistance, and flooding caused extensive damage. In the Analamanga Region, 18,000 people were reported to be left without shelter, and in the Atsinanana Region, up to 13,000 people were left homeless. In total, 190,000 people were homeless as a result of the cyclone and a total of 93 fatalities occurred.

Aftermath
Following the cyclone, the U.S. Agency for International Development airlifted relief commodities and supplies to Madagascar. The U.S. Agency for International Development also provided 320 rolls of plastic sheeting valued at $213,100 (2008 USD), which provided shelter assistance to 3,000 affected families, and they provided an additional $100,000 (2008 USD) to CARE and the U.N. World Food Program to re-establish ground access to affected areas, and deliver emergency supplies and food aid. This brought the total U.S. Government's assistance to Madagascar following the cyclone to more than $300,000.

Almost 140 volunteers were provided by Malagasy Red Cross in seven districts in the eastern part of the country to help in relief aid. The Malagasy Red Cross received extra supplies from the French Red Cross which mobilized its intervention platform in the Indian Ocean to provide logistical support. Twelve tonnes of material was provided from the main center on La Reunion Island, including tarpaulins, tool kits, generators, water tablets and other emergency supplies. Also, the Malagasy president made a donation of 8 millions of ariary to local branches of the Malagasy Red Cross along with 20 tonnes of rice. As a result of this, the Red Cross was able to distribute emergency items to 1,207 families; each family received 16 kilograms (35 pounds) of rice, 500 grams (17 ounces) of salt, 1.5 litres (50 fluid ounces) of oil, two bars of soap, candles and a lighter.

See also

Geography of Madagascar
Timeline of the 2007–08 South-West Indian Ocean cyclone season
Cyclone Giovanna

References

External links

 RSMC La Réunion
 Joint Typhoon Warning Center 

Ivan (2008)
Ivan (2008)
2008 in Madagascar
Ivan (2008)
Ivan